The 31st Annual Tony Awards was broadcast by ABC television on June 5, 1977, from the Shubert Theatre in New York City.

The ceremony
Hosts-Performers-Presenters were Jack Albertson, Beatrice Arthur, Buddy Ebsen,  Damon Evans, Jean Stapleton, and Leslie Uggams. Additional presenters-performers were Diana Ross, Jane Alexander, Alan Arkin, Lauren Bacall, Valerie Harper, Barry Manilow, Robert Preston, Tony Randall, and Lily Tomlin.

The theme of the show was survival; each host performed a solo, with songs of determination and perseverance, including "I'm Still Here", "Before the Parade Passes By", "Don't Rain On My Parade", "September Song", "You'll Never Walk Alone", "New York City Rhythm", "Climb Ev'ry Mountain" and "Being Alive".

Musicals represented:
 Annie ("You're Never Fully Dressed Without A Smile"/"Easy Street"/"Tomorrow" - Andrea McArdle, Dorothy Loudon and Company)
 Happy End ("Bilbao Song" - Company)
 I Love My Wife ("I Love My Wife"/"Married Couple Seeks Married Couple"/"Hey There, Good Times" - Company)
 Side by Side by Sondheim ("I'm Still Here" - Millicent Martin)

Winners and nominees
Winners are in bold

Special awards
Regional Theatre Award – Mark Taper Forum
Lawrence Langner Award – Cheryl Crawford
Lily Tomlin
Barry Manilow
Diana Ross for An Evening with Diana Ross
National Theatre For the Deaf
Equity Library Theatre

Multiple nominations and awards

These productions had multiple nominations:

10 nominations: Annie  
6 nominations: I Love My Wife and Porgy and Bess
5 nominations: The Cherry Orchard, The Shadow Box, Side by Side by Sondheim and The Threepenny Opera 
4 nominations: Your Arms Too Short to Box with God
3 nominations: Guys and Dolls and Happy End 
2 nominations: American Buffalo, Anna Christie, The Basic Training of Pavlo Hummel, Comedians, For Colored Girls Who Have Considered Suicide / When the Rainbow Is Enuf, Otherwise Engaged, No Man's Land, Streamers and Who's Afraid of Virginia Woolf?  

The following productions received multiple awards.

7 wins: Annie 
2 wins: The Cherry Orchard, I Love My Wife and The Shadow Box

See also
 Drama Desk Awards
 1977 Laurence Olivier Awards – equivalent awards for West End theatre productions
 Obie Award
 New York Drama Critics' Circle
 Theatre World Award
 Lucille Lortel Awards

External links
Tony Awards Official Site

Tony Awards ceremonies
1977 theatre awards
Tony
1977 in New York City
1970s in Manhattan